Wilfred Smith (7 April 1918 – 14 April 1968) was an English professional footballer who played as a full back.

Career
Smith began his career as an amateur with Clevedon Town before turning professional with Bristol Rovers. Smith spent ten years at Rovers and, because League football was suspended due to the Second World War, only made a total of 26 appearances in the Football League for them. Smith signed for Newport County in December 1946 in a swap deal involving Ken Wookey. At Newport, Smith made a further 9 League appearances. Smith later played in Wales with Abergavenny Thursdays.

References

1918 births
1968 deaths
English footballers
Clevedon Town F.C. players
Bristol Rovers F.C. players
Newport County A.F.C. players
Abergavenny Thursdays F.C. players
English Football League players
People from Pucklechurch
Association football fullbacks